There have been three baronetcies created for persons with the surname Chapman, one in the Baronetage of Great Britain, one in the Baronetage of Ireland and one in the Baronetage of the United Kingdom. Two of the creations are extinct while one is extant.

The Chapman Baronetcy, of London, was created in the Baronetage of Great Britain on 27 June 1720 for Sir William Chapman, a Director of the South Sea Company. His elder son, the second Baronet, represented Taunton in the House of Commons. He was childless and was succeeded by his younger brother, the third Baronet. He also had no children and on his death in 1785 the title became extinct.

The Chapman Baronetcy, of Killua Castle (also known as St Lucy's) in the County of Westmeath, was created in the Baronetage of Ireland on 11 March 1782 for Benjamin Chapman, with remainder to his younger brother Thomas. Chapman notably represented Fore and Westmeath in the Irish House of Commons. He was succeeded according to the special remainder by his brother Thomas, the second Baronet. His elder son, the third Baronet, sat as Member of Parliament for County Westmeath. He never married and was succeeded by his younger brother, the fourth Baronet. He also represented County Westmeath in Parliament and served as Lord Lieutenant of County Westmeath. The title became extinct on the death of the seventh Baronet in 1919. The seventh baronet abandoned his wife to live with his daughters' governess, Sarah Junner. The couple did not marry. Sir Thomas and Sarah had five illegitimate sons, of whom Thomas Edward Lawrence, best known as Lawrence of Arabia, was the second-eldest.

The Chapman Baronetcy, of Cleadon in what was then the County of Durham and now Tyne and Wear, was created in the Baronetage of the United Kingdom on 30 January 1958 for the soldier and former Conservative Member of Parliament for Houghton-le-Spring, Robert Chapman. His son, the second Baronet, was High Sheriff of Durham 1960. As of 2010 the title is held by the latter's son, the third Baronet, who succeeded in 1987. He is a deputy lieutenant of Tyne and Wear since 1997.

Chapman baronets of London (1720)
Sir William Chapman, 1st Baronet (–1737)
Sir John Chapman, 2nd Baronet (c. 1710–1781)
Sir William Chapman, 3rd Baronet (1714–1785)

Chapman baronets of Killua Castle (1782)
Sir Benjamin Chapman, 1st Baronet (died 1810)
Sir Thomas Chapman, 2nd Baronet (1756–1837)
Sir Montagu Lowther Chapman, 3rd Baronet (1808–1853)
Sir Benjamin James Chapman, 4th Baronet (1810–1888)
Sir Montagu Richard Chapman, 5th Baronet (1853–1907)
Sir Benjamin Rupert Chapman, 6th Baronet (1865–1914)
Sir Thomas Robert Tighe Chapman, 7th Baronet (1846–1919)

Chapman baronets of Cleadon (1958)
Sir Robert Chapman, 1st Baronet (1880–1963)
Sir Robert MacGowan Chapman, 2nd Baronet (1911–1987)
Sir David Robert Macgowan Chapman, 3rd Baronet (born 1941)
The heir apparent to the baronetcy is Michael Nicholas Chapman (born 1969)

Notes

References
Kidd, Charles, Williamson, David (editors). Debrett's Peerage and Baronetage (1990 edition). New York: St Martin's Press, 1990, 

 
1720 establishments in Great Britain
1785 disestablishments in Great Britain
1782 establishments in Ireland
1919 disestablishments in Ireland
1958 establishments in the United Kingdom
Baronetcies in the Baronetage of the United Kingdom
Extinct baronetcies in the Baronetage of Great Britain
Extinct baronetcies in the Baronetage of Ireland